Can Ayvazoğlu (born September 14, 1979 in Germany) is a Turkish volleyball player. He is 190 cm and plays as out-side hitter. He studied at Marmara University.

Career
He plays for Galatasaray Volleyball team since the 2007-08 season, and wear number 7. He played over 100 times for the national team. He also played for Izmir DSI, Polis Akademisi and Fenerbahçe Volleyball.

References

External links
 Player profile at galatasaray.org

1979 births
Living people
Turkish men's volleyball players
Fenerbahçe volleyballers
Polis Akademisi volleyballers
Galatasaray S.K. (men's volleyball) players
Halkbank volleyball players
Marmara University alumni
Ziraat Bankası volleyball players